Prince Friedrich Leopold of Prussia (14 November 1865 – 13 September 1931) was a son of Prince Frederick Charles of Prussia and Princess Maria Anna of Anhalt-Dessau, married in 1854.

Family 

On 24 June 1889, he married in Berlin Princess Louise Sophie of Schleswig-Holstein-Sonderburg-Augustenburg (8 April 1866 in Kiel – 28 April 1952 in Bad Nauheim), a sister of Empress Auguste Viktoria, wife of Emperor Wilhelm II.

Military career 
At age 10 in 1875 Kadett, in 1885 Premierlieutnant (Oberleutnant), 1888 Rittmeister (Hauptmann), 1890 Major and 1893 Oberst. 

In the same year promoted to Generalmajor, commander of the Gardes du Corps, a Cuirassiers regiment of the 1st Guards Cavalry Brigade.  Colonel-in-Chief of the Austrian k.u.k. Husarenregimentes Nr. 2 Friedrich Leopold, Prinz von Preußen (since 17. April 1742). 

1898 Generalleutnant, leader of Kavallerieinspektion Potsdam. In 1902 General der Kavallerie.  Served during Russian-Japanese War (1904–1905) as counselor in the Russian HQ. 1907 Generalinspektor of the Army, 10 September 1910 Generaloberst.

Other 

Prinz Friedrich Leopold was the last patron of the Prussian freemasons from the House of Hohenzollern.  A member since 1889 in "Friedrich Wilhelm zur Morgenröte", in 1894 he became patron of all three lodges.  During the November Revolution 1918, he hoisted a red flag on his hunting lodge Glienicke near Berlin.

He also owned a large manor at Krojanke, after 1918 located in Posen-West Prussia.  On 21 June 1924, possession was confirmed by the Reichsgericht. He died there in 1931.

Honours 
German honours

Foreign honours

Ancestry

Literature 
 Zivkovic, Georg: Heer- und Flottenführer der Welt. Biblio Verlag, Osnabrück, 1971 S. 427–428

References

External links 
 http://www.portrait-hille.de/genealog/tabln/HZ_Koe2.htm
 Österreichische Husaren at www.kuk-wehrmacht.de
 Kavallerie-Regiment1 at www.preussenweb.de
 Geschichte1 at www.schroederniko.de – Photo of Prinz Friedrich Leopold von Preußen
 Die Junkers F 13 at www.ju-f13.de

1865 births
1931 deaths
Prussian princes
Field marshals of the German Empire
Field marshals of Prussia
House of Hohenzollern
Military personnel from Berlin
Colonel generals of Prussia
19th-century Prussian military personnel
Recipients of the Iron Cross (1914), 1st class
Recipients of the Military Merit Cross (Mecklenburg-Schwerin), 1st class
2
2
Annulled Honorary Knights Grand Cross of the Royal Victorian Order
Grand Crosses of the Order of Saint Stephen of Hungary
Grand Crosses of the Order of the Crown (Romania)
Grand Crosses of the Order of the Star of Romania
Knights of the Order of Charles XIII
Recipients of the Order of the Sword
Recipients of the Order of St. George of the Fourth Degree